Clarinet Concerto is any concerto for clarinet.

Clarinet Concerto may also refer to:
 Clarinet Concerto (Carter)
 Clarinet Concerto (Copland)
 Clarinet Concerto (Corigliano)
 Clarinet Concerto (Eybler)
 Clarinet Concerto (Francaix)
 Clarinet Concerto (Hindemith)
 Clarinet Concerto (Lindberg)
 Clarinet Concerto (Mozart)
 Clarinet Concerto (Nielsen)
 Clarinet Concerto (Piston)
 Clarinet Concerto (Rouse)
 Clarinet Concerto (Tower)
 Clarinet Concerto (Zwilich)